Dzierzazna may refer to the following places in Poland:
Dzierżązna, Greater Poland Voivodeship
Dzierżązna, Łódź Voivodeship
Dzierzązna, Poddębice County, Łódź Voivodeship
Dzierzązna, Sieradz County, Łódź Voivodeship
Dzierzązna, Masovian Voivodeship
Dzierzążna, Lubusz Voivodeship